A banquet is a formal large meal  where a number of people consume food together. Banquets are traditionally held to enhance the prestige of a host, or reinforce social bonds among joint contributors. Modern examples of these purposes include a charitable gathering, a ceremony, or a celebration. They often involve speeches in honor of the topic or guest of honour.

The older English term for a lavish meal was a feast, and "banquet" originally meant a specific and different kind of meal, often following a feast, but in a different room or even building, which concentrated on sweet foods of various kinds.  These became highly fashionable as sugar became much more common in Europe at the start of the 16th century.  It was a grand form of the dessert course, and special banqueting houses, often on the roof or in the grounds of large houses, were built for them.  Such meals are also called a "sugar collation".

Social meanings 
Banquets feature luxury foods, often including animal meat. Feasts can be divided into two fundamental types: solidarity (or alliance, or empowering) and promotional (or aggrandisive, competitive, or diacritical). Solidarity feasts are a joint effort in which families or communities bring equivalent contributions together to reinforce the social ties of all concerned. Promotional feasts are intended to enhance the social status of the host, who provides the food in order to create obligations to themselves among the guests.

Historical examples
Communal feasting is evidenced from the early Neolithic in Britain. In Ancient Greece, symposia formed a routine part of life, involving the celebratory drinking of wine, conversation and performances of poetry and music. 

Notable historical and legendary examples of banquets include Belshazzar's Feast, the Last Supper, the Manchu Han Imperial Feast, and mead halls.

A luau is one variety of traditional banquet originally used in Hawaii. 

Many cultures have developed structures for banquets. In the European Middle Ages, comprehensive ritualised elements were involved in a traditional three-course menu, having up to 25 dishes in each course (this structure persisted into the 19th century). The structure was later altered to two courses, with the pre-existing third course changed to the serving of fruit and nuts.

Banqueting rooms varied greatly with location, but tended to be on an intimate scale, either in a garden room, banquet hall or inside such as the small banqueting turrets in Longleat House. 

Art historians have often noted that banqueters on iconographic records of ancient Mediterranean societies almost always appear to be lying down on their left sides. One possible explanation could lie in the anatomy of the stomach and in the digestive mechanism. When lying on the left, the food has room to expand because the curvature of the stomach is enhanced in that position.

Contemporary examples 
Contemporary banquets serve many new purposes in addition to their traditional purposes. These can include anything from during workplace training sessions and formal business dinners to birthday parties and social gatherings. It is common for a banquet to be organized at the end of academic conferences.

Government intervention 
The State Council of the People's Republic of China levied a tax on banquets on September 2nd 1988, at a tax rate calculated per occasion between 15% to 20% of the banquet's value.

Banquets held over time

See also

Assembly hall
Beefsteak (banquet)
List of dining events
Party

References

Strong, Roy, Feast: A History of Grand Eating, 2002, Jonathan Cape,

Further reading

Eating parties
Balls (dance party)